Rocky Peak is a summit in the U.S. state of Nevada.

Rocky Peak was so named on account of its rocky character.

References

Mountains of Humboldt County, Nevada